Metius striatus is a species of ground beetle in the subfamily Pterostichinae. It was described by Putzeys in 1875.

References

Metius (genus)
Beetles described in 1875